Derrick Alexander (born November 13, 1973) is a former defensive end who played for the Minnesota Vikings and Cleveland Browns of the National Football League.  He was drafted from Florida State University in the first round of the 1995 NFL Draft ahead of such big names as Hugh Douglas and Warren Sapp.

After Alexander retired, he worked in the front office for the Cleveland Browns for several years. Alexander was inducted into the Florida State Hall of Fame in 2007.  From 2011 to 2013 he was the head football coach at Bishop McLaughlin Catholic High School in Spring Hill, Florida.

References

1973 births
Players of American football from Jacksonville, Florida
Living people
William M. Raines High School alumni
American football defensive ends
American football defensive tackles
Florida State Seminoles football players
Cleveland Browns players
Minnesota Vikings players
Ed Block Courage Award recipients